John Z. Kiss (born 1960) is an American biologist known for his work on the gravitational and space biology of plants. Kiss is dean of the College of Arts & Sciences at the University of North Carolina Greensboro. Previously, he was a professor of biology and dean of the Graduate School at the University of Mississippi. and distinguished professor and chair of the botany department at Miami University. He has worked with NASA since 1987 and served as principal investigator on eight spaceflight experiments on the Space Shuttle, the former Russian space station Mir, and on the International Space Station. His research focuses on the sensory physiology of plants in space. He received the NASA Outstanding Public Leadership Medal in 2014. In 2021, Asteroid Kiss 8267 was named in his honor, a recognition that coincided with his receipt of the 2021 COSPAR International Cooperation Medal. His international collaboration on a spaceflight project with NASA and the European Space Agency has led to the discovery of novel sensory mechanisms in plants.

Education 
Kiss received his Bachelor of Science degree in biology from Georgetown University. and a Ph.D. in botany and plant physiology from Rutgers University in 1987. His doctoral work focused on biosynthesis of the storage carbohydrate paramylon in the alga Euglena. From 1987–1990 Kiss conducted post-doctoral work on gravitropism in plants at Ohio State University, where he was first introduced to NASA-related research. His first funded project, on gravity perception and response mechanisms, was as a NASA research associate at the University of Colorado at Boulder from 1990–1991.

Personal life 

Kiss is married to Helen Guiragossian Kiss, who also received her Ph.D. from Rutgers University and works in higher education research. They have one son, Stephen Vahe Kiss.

Academic career 
Kiss’ first tenure-track appointment was as an assistant professor at Hofstra University from 1991–1993. From (1993–2012) he worked at Miami University becoming a University Distinguished Professor in 2011. The following year, Kiss received the Benjamin Harrison Medallion, the highest recognition by Miami University for “extraordinary contributions related to teaching, research, and service”. He has had faculty appointments as professor of biology at the University of Mississippi (2012–16) and the University of North Carolina Greensboro (2016–present) and had an active research laboratory while serving as dean at both universities.

Research 
Kiss' research focuses on plants in space, specifically how gravity and light responses influence each other in plants. His work seeks to understand the cellular signaling mechanisms involved in plant tropisms—directed plant movement and growth in response to external stimuli. Early in his career, Kiss focused on the cellular mechanisms that mediate gravitropism. In addition, he is interested in how plants adapt to weightlessness and low-gravity environments, which is important for determining the ability of plants to provide a complete, sustainable, and dependable means for human life support in space.

Kiss was the principal investigator on eight spaceflight projects on the Space Shuttle, Mir, and the International Space Station. His major collaborators on these space projects included Richard E. Edelmann from Miami University and F. Javier Medina from Centro de Investigaciones Biológicas (CSIC) in Spain. This spaceflight research contributed to the discovery of a novel red-light sensing mechanism involved in phototropism of flowering plants. Kiss also was one of the first scientists to study plant behavior at fractional or reduced gravity on the ISS. Kiss and his coworkers have contributed toward understanding the effects of microgravity/reduced gravity on transcription and gene expression in plants.

Outreach 
In 2019, Kiss gave a TEDx talk on the importance of plants for a human mission to Mars. In 2020, he was interviewed on the Interplanetary Podcast and the Orbital Mechanics Podcast to discuss his work as a plant space biologist.

Spaceflight missions 
Summary of the spaceflight projects flown on vehicles in low Earth orbit with John Z. Kiss serving as the principal investigator:

References 

1960 births
Living people
20th-century American botanists
21st-century American botanists
Space scientists
Hungarian emigrants to the United States
People from Szeged
Georgetown University alumni
Rutgers University alumni
Hofstra University faculty
Miami University faculty
University of Mississippi faculty
University of North Carolina at Greensboro faculty